Maximilien de Béthune, 1st Prince of Sully, Marquis of Rosny and Nogent, Count of Muret and Villebon, Viscount of Meaux (13 December 156022 December 1641) was a nobleman, soldier, statesman, and counselor of King Henry IV of France. Historians emphasize Sully's role in building a strong centralized administrative system in France using coercion and highly effective new administrative techniques. While not all of his policies were original, he used them well to revitalize France after the European Religious Wars. Most, however, were repealed by later monarchs who preferred absolute power. Historians have also studied his Neostoicism and his ideas about virtue, prudence, and discipline.

Biography

Early years

He was born at the Château de Rosny near Mantes-la-Jolie into a branch of the House of Béthune a noble family originating in Artois, and was brought up in the Reformed faith, a Huguenot. In 1571, at the age of eleven, Maximilien was presented to Henry of Navarre and remained permanently attached to the future king of France. The young Baron of Rosny was taken to Paris by his patron and was studying at the Collège de Bourgogne at the time of the St Bartholomew's Day Massacre, from which he escaped by discreetly carrying a Catholic book of hours under his arm. He studied mathematics and history at the court of Henry of Navarre.

A warrior with Henry 
On the renewed outbreak of civil war in 1575, he enlisted in the Protestant army. In 1576 he accompanied the Duke of Anjou, younger brother of king Henri III, on an expedition into the Netherlands in order to regain the former Rosny estates, but being unsuccessful he attached himself for a time to the Prince of Orange. Later, rejoining Henry of Navarre in Guyenne, he displayed bravery in the field and particular ability as a military engineer. 
In 1583 he acted as Henry's special agent in Paris, and during a respite in the Wars of Religion he married an heiress who died five years later.

On the renewal of civil war, Rosny again joined Henry of Navarre, and at the battle of Ivry (1590) he was seriously wounded. He counselled Henry IV's conversion to Roman Catholicism (made official on 25 July 1593) but steadfastly refused to become a Catholic himself. Once Henry IV of France's succession to the throne was secured, the faithful and trusted Rosny received his reward in the shape of numerous estates and dignities.

Sully in power
From 1596, when he was added to Henry's finance commission, Rosny introduced some order into France's economic affairs. Acting as sole Superintendent of Finances  at the end of 1601, he authorized the free exportation of grain and wine, reduced legal interest, established a special court to try cases of speculation, forbade provincial governors to raise money on their own authority, and otherwise removed many abuses of tax-collecting. Rosny abolished several offices, and by his honest, rigorous conduct of the country's finances, he was able to save between 1600 and 1610 an average of a million livres a year.

His achievements were not solely financial. In 1599, he was appointed grand commissioner of highways and public works, superintendent of fortifications and grand master of artillery; in 1602, governor of Nantes and of Jargeau, captain-general of the Queen's gens d'armes and governor of the Bastille; in 1604, he was governor of Poitou; and in 1606, made first duke of Sully and a pair de France, ranking next to princes of the blood. He declined the office of constable of France because he would not become a Roman Catholic.

Sully encouraged agriculture, urged the free circulation of produce, promoted stock-raising, forbade the destruction of the forests, drained swamps, built roads and bridges, planned a vast system of canals and actually began the Canal de Briare. He strengthened the French military establishment; under his direction, the construction of a great line of defences on the frontiers began. Abroad, Sully opposed the king's colonial policy as inconsistent with French interests, in opposition to men like Champlain who urged greater colonial efforts in Canada and elsewhere. Neither did Sully show much favor toward industrial pursuits but, on the urgent solicitation of the king, he established a few silk factories. He fought together with Henry IV in Savoy (1600–1601) and negotiated the treaty of peace in 1602; in 1603, he represented Henry at the court of James I of England; and throughout the reign, he helped the king to put down insurrections of the nobles, whether Roman Catholic or Protestant. It was Sully, too, who arranged the marriage between Henry IV and Marie de' Medici.

Fall from power and last years
The political role of Sully effectively ended with the assassination of Henry IV on 14 May 1610. The king was on his way to visit Sully, who lay ill in the Arsenal; his purpose was to make final preparations for imminent military intervention in the disputed succession to Jülich-Cleves-Berg after the death of Duke John William. The intervention on behalf of a Calvinist candidate would have brought the king in conflict with the Catholic Habsburg dynasty.

Although a member of the Queen's council of regency, his colleagues were not inclined to put up with his domineering leadership, and after a stormy debate he resigned as superintendent of finances on 26 January 1611, retiring into private life.

The queen mother gave him 300,000 livres for his long services and confirmed him in possession of his estates. He attended the meeting of the Estates-General in 1614, and on the whole was in sympathy with the policy and government of Richelieu. He disavowed the Blockade of La Rochelle, in 1621, but in the following year was briefly arrested.

The baton of marshal of France was conferred on him on 18 September 1634. The last years of his life were spent chiefly at Villebon, Rosny and his château of Sully. He died at Villebon at the age of 81.

Family
By his first wife, Anne de Courtenay (died 1589), daughter of François, Lord of Bontin, he had one son, Maximilien, Marquess of Rosny (1587–1634), who led a life of dissipation and debauchery. By his second wife, Rachel de Cochefilet (1566–1659), the widow of François Hurault, Lord of Chateaupers, whom he married in 1592 and who turned Protestant to please him, he had nine children, of whom six died young. Their son François (1598–1678) was created first Duke of Orval. The elder daughter Marguerite (1595–1660) in 1605, married Henri, Duke of Rohan, while the younger Louise in 1620 married Alexandre de Lévis, Marquess of Mirepoix.

His brother, Philippe de Béthune, was sent as ambassador to James VI of Scotland in May 1599. He was given a good welcome and invited to Falkland Palace. He went on a progress with James VI to Inchmurrin and Hamilton Palace, after the king had written to the Laird of Wemyss for the loan of his best hackney horse and saddle.

Accomplishments

Sully was very unpopular because he was a favorite and was seen as selfish, obstinate, and rude. He was hated by most Catholics because he was a Protestant, and by most Protestants because he was faithful to the king. 
He amassed a large personal fortune, and his jealousy of all other ministers and favorites was extravagant. Nevertheless, he was an excellent man of business, inexorable in punishing malversation and dishonesty on the part of others, and opposed to ruinous court expenditures that was the bane of almost all European monarchies in his day. He was gifted with executive ability, with confidence and resolution, with fondness for work, and above all with deep devotion to his master. He was implicitly trusted by Henry IV and proved himself the most able assistant of the king in dispelling the chaos into which the religious and civil wars had plunged France. After Henry IV, Sully was a major driving force behind the happy transformation in France between 1598 and 1610, in which agriculture and commerce benefitted, and peace and internal order were reestablished.

After the death of Henry IV Sully published, in the deceased king's name, his ‘Grand Design’, a plan to stop the religious wars. His starting point was that the three churches (Catholic, Lutheran and Calvinist) were there to stay. He planned an international organization, consisting of a Europe of 15 more or less equally strong powers, incidentally dissolving the Habsburg empire and thus making France Europe’s strongest state. A balance of power mechanism and a permanent assembly of ambassadors should prevent wars in Europe. Military power would only be needed towards the Muslim Ottoman Empire.

Titles

During his life, Sully inherited or acquired the following titles:
Duke of Sully
 Peer of France
 Marshal of France
 Sovereign Prince of Henrichemont and Boisbelle
 Marquess of Rosny
 Marquess of Nogent-le-Béthune
 Count of Muret
 Count of Villebon
 Viscount of Meaux
 Viscount of Champrond
 Baron of Conti
 Baron of Caussade
 Baron of Montricoux
 Baron of Montigny
 Baron of Breteuil
 Baron of Francastel
 Lord of La Falaise
 Lord of Las
 Lord of Vitray
 Lord of Lalleubellouis
 Lord of various other places

Works 

Sully left a collection of memoirs (Mémoires, otherwise known as the Économies royales, 1638) written in the second person very valuable for the history of the time and as an autobiography, in spite of the fact that they contain many fictions, such as a mission undertaken by Sully to Queen Elizabeth I of England in 1601. Perhaps among his most famous works was the idea of a Europe composed of 15 roughly equal states, under the direction of a "Very Christian Council of Europe", charged with resolving differences and disposing of a common army. This famous "Grand Design", a utopian plan for a Christian republic, is often cited as one of the first grand plans and ancestors for the European Union. Two folio volumes of the memoirs were splendidly printed, nominally at Amsterdam, but really under Sully's own eye, at his château of Sully in 1638; two other volumes appeared posthumously in Paris in 1662.

 
 
 
For a partial modern edition, see David Buisseret and Bernard Barbiche, "Les Oeconomies royales de Sully," 4 vols., Paris 1970-2019

Legacy
The Pavillon Sully (Pavillon de l'Horloge) of the Palais du Louvre is named in honor of the Duc de Sully.
The Ormeau Sully, an ancient field elm Ulmus minor, reputedly planted by Sully, survives (2016) in the village of Villesequelande near Carcassonne. 
In the independent principality of Boisbelle, which he acquired in 1605, he started construction of a capital at Henrichemont.
Many buildings at Paris, including the Place Royale, the Hopital Saint-Louis and the Arsenal

Sources
His ancestry is traced at length and his career more briefly, reproducing original documents, in the monumental Histoire généalogique de la Maison de Béthune by the historian André Duchesne (Paris, 1639)

Portraits in fiction
 In the 1938 Die Vollendung des Königs Henri Quatre book by Heinrich Mann
 Sully is the chief protagonist of the 1893 romance From the Memoirs of a Minister of France by Stanley Weyman.

Further reading
  Barbiche, Bernard and Segolene de Dainville-Barbiche, "Sully" (Paris, 1997)
  Buisseret, David. Sully and the growth of centralized government in France, 1598-1610  (1968)

References

Attribution

External links
 Memoirs of the Duke of Sully, Prime-Minister to Henry the Great

1560 births
1641 deaths
People from Yvelines
French Protestants
Huguenots
Ancien Régime office-holders
Dukes of Sully
Marshals of France
French people of the French Wars of Religion
Heads of the Bâtiments du Roi
French Ministers of Finance
17th-century peers of France
Peers created by Henry IV of France